The 2022 La Drôme Classic, officially the Faun Drôme Classic due to sponsorships, was the 9th edition of the Drôme Classic cycle race. It was held on 27 February 2022 as a category 1.Pro race on the 2022 UCI ProSeries. The race started and finished in Étoile-sur-Rhône and featured several climbs throughout. It formed a pair of races on the same weekend with the 2022 Faun-Ardèche Classic, held on the previous day.

Teams 
Eleven of the eighteen UCI WorldTeams, six UCI ProTeams, and five UCI Continental teams made up the twenty-two teams that participated in the race, with a total of 146 riders. 113 riders finished.

UCI WorldTeams

 
 
 
 
 
 
 
 
 
 
 

UCI ProTeams

 
 
 
 
 
 

UCI Continental Teams

Result

References

External links 
 

La Drôme Classic
La Drôme Classic
20221
La Drôme Classic